Jonathan Tetelman (born 1988) is an American operatic tenor who has established an international career, especially in Europe, in such roles as Verdi's Alfredo, Massenet's Werther, Puccini's Rodolfo, Cavaradossi and Pinkerton, and Giordano's Loris Ipanov.

Career 
Tetelman was born in Castro, Chile. He was adopted as a baby and grew up in Princeton, New Jersey. He studied at the Manhattan School of Music in New York as a baritone before further study at the Mannes School of Music where he made the transition to tenor.

He appeared as Rodolfo at the Komische Oper Berlin, the English National Opera and the Royal Opera House, and Cavaradossi at the Teatro Regio in Turin, the Opéra de Lille, the Gran Teatro del Liceo in Barcelona, the Semperoper in Dresden and Deutsche Oper Berlin. He also appeared as Alfredo at the Royal Opera House, as Pinkerton at the Opéra Comédie in Montpellier, and as Werther at the Teatro Solís in Montevideo. After singing the Duke in Verdi's Rigoletto at Oper Frankfurt, he was invited back in 2022 to perform Loris Ipanov alongside Nadja Stefanoff in the title role, Fedora, leading the Frankfurter Allgemeine Zeitung to describe his voice as "of intense, inescapable euphony, warmly grounded, full-bodied, yet admirably elegant and supple" ("von intensivem, unentrinnbarem Wohlklang, warm grundiert, körperreich, dabei bewundernswert elegant und geschmeidig"). Another critic called him "ideal" for the role.

Tetelman's concert repertory includes Beethoven's Ninth Symphony, which he has sung with the San Francisco Symphony Orchestra and the Stuttgarter Philharmoniker, Verdi's Requiem and Elgar's The Dream of Gerontius.
 
In 2021 he signed a contract with Deutsche Grammophon as exclusive artist.

References

External links 
 
 Jonathan Tetelman / Tenor operabase.com

1988 births
Living people
American operatic tenors
Deutsche Grammophon artists
21st-century American singers
Manhattan School of Music alumni
Mannes School of Music alumni
People from Princeton, New Jersey